LibriVox is a group of worldwide volunteers who read and record public domain texts, creating free public domain audiobooks for download from their website and other digital library hosting sites on the internet. It was founded in 2005 by Hugh McGuire to provide "Acoustical liberation of books in the public domain" and the LibriVox objective is "To make all books in the public domain available, for free, in audio format on the internet".

On 6 August 2016, the completed projects numbered 10,000, and on 14 February 2021 there were 15,000 completed projects. Most releases are in the English language, but many non-English works are also available. There are multiple affiliated projects that are providing additional content. LibriVox is closely affiliated with Project Gutenberg from where the project gets some of its texts, and the Internet Archive that hosts their offerings.

History

LibriVox was started in August 2005 by Montreal-based writer Hugh McGuire, who set up a blog, and posed the question. The first recorded book was The Secret Agent by Joseph Conrad.

The main features of the way LibriVox works have changed little since its inception, although the technology that supports it has been improved by the efforts of its volunteers with web-development skills.

Etymology of LibriVox 
The word was also coined because of other connotations:  also means child and free, independent, unrestricted. As the LibriVox forum says: "We like to think LibriVox might be interpreted as 'child of the voice', and 'free voice'. Finally, the other link we like is 'library' so you could imagine it to mean Library of Voice."

There has been no decision or consensus by LibriVox founders or the community of volunteers for a single pronunciation of LibriVox. It is accepted that any pronunciation is accurate.

Organization and funding 
LibriVox is a volunteer-run, free content, public domain project. It has no budget or legal personality. The development of projects is managed through an Internet forum, supported by an admin team, who also maintain a searchable catalogue database of completed works.

In early 2010, LibriVox ran a fundraising drive to raise $20,000 to cover hosting costs for the website of about $5,000/year and improve front- and backend usability. The target was reached in 13 days, and so the fundraising ended and LibriVox suggested that supporters consider making donations to its affiliates and partners, Project Gutenberg and the Internet Archive.

Production process
Volunteers can choose new projects to start, either recording on their own or inviting others to join them, or they can contribute to projects that have been started by others. Once a volunteer has recorded his or her contribution, it is uploaded to the site, and proof-listened by members of the LibriVox community.

Finished audiobooks are available from the LibriVox website, and MP3 files are hosted separately by the Internet Archive. Recordings are also available through other means, such as YouTube and iTunes, and, being free of copyright, they are frequently distributed independently of LibriVox on the Internet and otherwise.

Content

LibriVox only records material that is in the public domain in the United States, and all LibriVox books are released with a public domain dedication. Because of copyright restrictions, LibriVox produces recordings of only a limited number of contemporary books. These have included, for example, the 9/11 Commission Report which is a work of the US Federal Government therefore in the Public Domain.

The LibriVox catalogue is varied. It contains much popular classic fiction, but also includes less predictable texts, such as Immanuel Kant's Critique of Pure Reason and a recording of the first 500 digits of pi. The collection also features poetry, plays, religious texts (for example, English versions of the Koran and books from various translations of the Bible) and non-fiction of various kinds. In January 2009, the catalogue contained approximately 55 percent fiction and drama, 25 percent non-fiction and 20 percent poetry (calculated by numbers of recordings). By the end of 2022, the most viewed item (19.6M) was a reading of The Art of War attributed to Sun Tzu and read in 2006 by Moira Fogarty.

Around 90 percent of the catalogue is recorded in English, but recordings exist in 31 languages altogether. Chinese, French and German are the most popular languages other than English amongst volunteers, but recordings have also been made in languages including Urdu and Tagalog.

Reputation
LibriVox has garnered significant interest, in particular from those interested in the promotion of volunteer-led content and alternative approaches to copyright ownership on the Internet.

It has received support from the Internet Archive and Project Gutenberg. Intellectual freedom and commons proponent Mike Linksvayer described it in 2008 as "perhaps the most interesting collaborative culture project this side of Wikipedia".

The project has also been featured in press around the world and has been recommended by the BBC's Click, MSNBC's The Today Show, Reason, Wired, the US PC Magazine and the UK Metro and Sunday Times newspapers.

Quality
A frequent concern of listeners is the site's policy of allowing any recording to be published as long as it is understandable and faithful to the source text. This means that some recordings are of lower audio fidelity; some feature background noises, non-native accents or other perceived imperfections in comparison to professionally recorded audiobooks. While some listeners may object to those books with chapters read by multiple readers, others find this to be a non-issue or even a feature, though many books are narrated by a single reader.

See also 
 Virtual volunteering
 Voice acting

References

External links 

Accessible information
Audiobook companies and organizations
American book websites
Collaborative projects
Open content projects
Public domain books